Fox Hall may refer to:

 Fox Hall, West Virginia
 Fox Hall (Westmore, Vermont), a historic house
 Kenneth R. Fox Student Union, a building at the University of Massachusetts Lowell

See also
 Foxhall (disambiguation)